Rot in the Sun is a song by American alternative rock band The Presidents of the United States of America. It was released as a single on December 23, 2008 on Fugitive Records. It is the third single from the album These Are the Good Times People.

Music video
The music video for "Rot in the Sun" features band members Chris Ballew, Andrew McKeag and Jason Finn as paper dolls playing their instruments in front of a coloured paper background. Their faces were filmed and then superimposed onto the recording of the paper dolls.

Reception

References

External links
 

2008 songs
Songs written by Chris Ballew
The Presidents of the United States of America (band) songs